The Märkische Museum Railway or MME is a German railway society that was founded in order to show narrow gauge vehicles in operation on small branch lines.

History 
Found on 14 July 1982 at Plettenberg, the society used the opportunity to buy vehicles, that had formerly worked in the Sauerland, from the Juist and Spiekerooge island railways which had just closed.
The priority for their collection is the following railways:

 Kreis Altenaer Eisenbahn (KAE), 1888–1967
 Plettenberger Kleinbahn (PKB), 1896–1962
 Iserlohner Kreisbahn (IKB), 1900–1964
 Hohenlimburger Kleinbahn (HKB), 1900–1983
 Kleinbahn Haspe-Voerde-Breckerfeld (HVB), 1903–1963

In Plettenberg the society could take over the remaining trackage from the PKB and set up a temporary workshop in an old boiler house in order to restore the vehicles acquired.
In the margins, relicts of the Ruhr-Lippe-Eisenbahn (RLE) and a host of narrow gauge industrial railway were able to be salvaged, including for example the historically interesting Harkort Coal Railway,which was founded by the industrial pioneer, Friedrich Harkort, and went into service in 1830 – no less than five years before the Nuremberg–Fürth railway – albeit initially as a wagonway.

Museum railway 

The society found a suitable site for the establishment of its  museum railway on the trackbed of the Plettenberg–Herscheid railway between Hüinghausen station and Köbbinghausen halt (formerly timetable route (Kursbuchstrecke or KBS) no. 239k, which had closed in 1969 and been subsequently dismantled. Operations are carried out under the name of the Sauerland Light Railway (Sauerländer Kleinbahn).

External links 

 Sauerland Light Railway

Heritage railways in Germany
Metre gauge railways in Germany